The Aryamehr Cup (Persian: جام آریامهر) is a defunct men's professional tennis tournament that was played on the World Championship Tennis circuit in 1971 and on the Grand Prix tennis circuit from 1973 to 1977. The event was held at the Imperial Country Club in Tehran, Iran and was played on outdoor clay courts.

Past finals

Singles

Doubles

External links
 ATP result archives

 
Grand Prix tennis circuit
Clay court tennis tournaments
ATP Tour
Tennis tournaments in Iran
Defunct tennis tournaments in Asia
Defunct sports competitions in Iran